Pittsburgh Riverhounds SC is an American professional soccer team based in Pittsburgh, Pennsylvania. Founded in 1999 and beginning play in 1999, the club plays in the Eastern Conference of the USL Championship, the second tier of the American soccer pyramid. Since 2013, the Riverhounds have played their home games at the 5,000-seat Highmark Stadium, a soccer-specific stadium located in Station Square. Their current head coach is Bob Lilley. Saint Lucian international David Flavius currently holds the club records for most appearances and goals which he set over his eight seasons with the Riverhounds between 1999 and 2006. In June 2017, the Riverhounds entered into a developmental partnership with the Ocean City Nor'easters of the Premier Development League, running through the 2018 season.

In 2013, the Riverhounds organization announced its intentions to join Major League Soccer by 2023; but have never submitted a formal bid during any of the league's rounds of expansion. Highmark Stadium initially seated 3,500 spectators, though the stadium is designed to be capable of being expanded to 18,500.

History

Colors and badge
Originally, the Riverhounds' colors were predominantly red with smaller amounts of black and white. Pittsburgh-based BD&E designed the original logo. The firm made a strategic decision not to make the club's colors black and gold. The choice meant the Hounds would not align with the region's established professional sports identity but would allow the soccer fans' jerseys to stand out in a Pittsburgh crowd. The club adopted new colors, predominantly blue with white and black added, before the start of the 2008 season to honor their academy and training partnership with Everton. The use of blue was also an allusion to the blue collar populace of Pittsburgh. Beginning in 2014, the Riverhounds began wearing black and gold uniforms more regularly, aligning the club with the colors representative of Pittsburgh's other professional sports teams. Blue and black kits continued to be worn as an alternate third version.

On February 16, 2018, the Riverhounds unveiled a new crest as part of its rebranding. The new crest incorporates traditional Pittsburgh sports colors with important symbols of the city such as bridges and rivers. The crest was designed by Oregon-based graphic designer Brian Gundell.

Sponsorship

 Source(s):

Stadium
Pittsburgh Riverhounds SC has played at Highmark Stadium, a 5,000 seat soccer-specific stadium in Station Square, since 2013. The stadium is owned and operated by the Riverhounds organization.

Supporters
In November 2007, the first supporters group of the Pittsburgh Riverhounds was formed, The Steel Army. The Steel Army held their first meeting at Piper's Pub in Pittsburgh's South Side. The group started as 5–10 local people interested in supporting the reorganized Riverhounds Soccer Club and in supporting the efforts of growing the sport of soccer in Western Pennsylvania as well.

Members are from Pittsburgh and nearby states like Ohio and distant states such as Oregon and Florida. Membership in the Steel Army is also international. Members have joined from Portsmouth, Sunderland, Surrey and Derbyshire in the U.K., Bray in the Republic of Ireland, and Rio de Janeiro in Brazil.

The section of Highmark Stadium where the Steel Army stands and supports the Riverhounds is located at the South Gate end of the stadium. The terrace there holds 1,000 supporters. On August 1, 2015, the supporters' section was renamed the Paul Child Stand in honor of Pittsburgh soccer legend Paul Child. The Steel Army had fierce rivalries with United Soccer League clubs Penn FC (Sons of Susquehanna) and the Rochester Rhinos (Oak Street Brigade) before both clubs moved to USL League One.

Players and staff

Current roster

Team management
{|class="wikitable"
|-
!style="background:#FFC62C; color:black; border:2px solid #000;" scope="col" colspan=2|Front Office
|-

|-
!style="background:#FFC62C; color:black; border:2px solid #000;" scope="col" colspan=2|Coaching Staff
|-

|-
!style="background:#FFC62C; color:black; border:2px solid #000;" scope="col" colspan=2|Riverhounds Development Academy
|-

Honors
 USL Pro Soccer League
 Atlantic Division Champions (1): 2004
 USL Championship
 Eastern Conference Regular Season Champions (1): 2019

Record

This is a partial list of the last five seasons completed by the Riverhounds. For the full season-by-season history, see List of Pittsburgh Riverhounds SC seasons.

1. Avg. attendance include statistics from league matches only.
2. Top goalscorer(s) includes all goals scored in league, league playoffs, U.S. Open Cup, CONCACAF Champions League, FIFA Club World Cup, and other competitive continental matches.

See also
 Pittsburgh Riverhounds SC records and results
 History of Pittsburgh Riverhounds SC
 Pittsburgh Riverhounds U23

References

External links
 
 Steel Army Supporters Group

 
Soccer clubs in Pittsburgh
USL Championship teams
USL Second Division teams
A-League (1995–2004) teams
Association football clubs established in 1999
1999 establishments in Pennsylvania
Soccer clubs in Pennsylvania